The canton of Luçon is an administrative division of the Vendée department, western France. Its borders were modified at the French canton reorganisation which came into effect in March 2015. Its seat is in Luçon.

It consists of the following communes:
 
Chaillé-les-Marais
Champagné-les-Marais
Chasnais
Grues
Le Gué-de-Velluire
L'Île-d'Elle
Lairoux
Luçon
Les Magnils-Reigniers
Moreilles
Mouzeuil-Saint-Martin
Nalliers
Pouillé
Puyravault
Saint-Denis-du-Payré
Sainte-Gemme-la-Plaine
Sainte-Radégonde-des-Noyers
Saint-Michel-en-l'Herm
La Taillée
Triaize
Vouillé-les-Marais

References

Cantons of Vendée